Fine Arts Building may refer to:

Fine Arts Building (Los Angeles), a.k.a. The Standard Oil Building, in Los Angeles, California
Fine Arts Building (Chicago), Illinois, a.k.a. The Studebaker Building, listed on the National Register of Historic Places in Chicago, Illinois
A demolished theater on Grand Park Centre, Detroit, Michigan
Exhibitors Building (Grand Rapids, Michigan) (formerly Fine Arts Building), listed on the National Register of Historic Places in Kent County, Michigan
American Fine Arts Building, Manhattan, New York
Fine Arts Building (Heidelberg University), formerly listed on the National Register of Historic Places in Seneca County, Ohio
Frick Fine Arts Building, at the University of Pittsburgh, in Pittsburgh, Pennsylvania
 Fine Arts Building, a.k.a. President's House, a former building on the Queens Campus of Rutgers University
 Fine Arts Building (Seattle University), Washington, U.S.

Buildings and structures disambiguation pages